Dimitri Bergé (born 5 February 1996) is a French speedway rider.

Career

International
Bergés' major honours include the 2009 125cc Grasstrack and the World 250cc Longtrack Champion 2012. He was World Under-21 finalist in 2016 and 2017 and represented France in the 2018 Speedway of Nations. 

As well as Speedway he is an accomplished Long Track rider and won a bronze medal in the 2015 Individual Long Track World Championship. He won the first round in Herxheim, Germany and finished runner-up overall in the 2018 Individual Long Track World Championship. He was also a member of the France team who won the Team Long Track World Championship for the first time in front of their ecstatic fans in Morizes on 1 September 2018 scoring 22 of France's 54 points winning total. Dimitri has also represented his native France in the Speedway of Nations.

Domestic
He rode for the Redcar Bears having joined them in 2018. He signed for Belle Vue Aces for the 2018 and 2019 seasons.

Family
His father Philippe Bergé was also an international speedway rider.

Major results

Individual Long Track World Championship

Best Grand-Prix results
  Eenrum  First 2016, 2018.
  Morizes First 2016, 2019, Third 2015.
  La Réole Second 2019, Third 2018.
  Herxheim Second 2015, 2018, Third 2019, .
  Mühldorf  Second 2018, 2019.

Team Long Track World Championship
 2018  Morizes (Champion) 54pts (rode with Mathieu Trésarrieu, David Bellego, Stéphane Trésarrieu)
 2019  Vechta (Champion) 64pts (rode with Mathieu Trésarrieu, David Bellego, Stéphane Trésarrieu)

European Grasstrack Championship
 2018  Tayac (Champion) 19pts

Speedway of Nations

References 

French speedway riders
1996 births
Living people
Individual Speedway Long Track World Championship riders
People from Marmande
Sportspeople from Lot-et-Garonne